A pulmonic consonant is a consonant produced by air pressure from the lungs, as opposed to ejective, implosive and click consonants.

Most languages have only pulmonic consonants. Ian Maddieson, in his survey of 566 languages, found that only 152 had ejectives, implosives, or clicks (or two or three of these types) – that is, 73% of the world's extant languages have only pulmonic consonants. See glottalic consonants and click consonants for more information on the distribution of nonpulmonic consonants.

Chart

See also
 Ejective consonant
 Implosive consonant
 Click consonant
 Airstream mechanism

References